Coco Gauff won the title, defeating Rebeka Masarova in the final, 6–1, 6–1. It was her third career title, not losing a set throughout the tournament.

Serena Williams was the reigning champion from when the event was last held in 2020, but retired from professional tennis in 2022.

Seeds

Draw

Finals

Top half

Bottom half

Qualifying

Seeds

Qualifiers

Qualifying draw

First qualifier

Second qualifier

Third qualifier

Fourth qualifier

Fifth qualifier

Sixth qualifier

References

External links 
Main draw
Qualifying draw

2023 WTA Tour
WTA Auckland Open